The Kamjong district of Manipur state in India is divided into 4 sub-districts called blocks.  At the time of the 2011 Census of India, the Kamjong district (created in 2016) was a part of the Ukhrul district.

Blocks 

The Kamjong district has four sub-divisions called blocks: Kamjong, Phungyar, Sahamphung, and Kasom Khullen.

Villages

Kamjong block 

The Kamjong block includes the following villages:

Phungyar 

The Phungyar block includes the following villages:

The following villages are not listed in the 2011 census directory: Ngabrum (Kumram), Leinganching, and Nagyophung.

Sahamphung 

The Sahamphung block includes the following villages:

Kasom Khullen 

The Kasom Khullen block includes the following villages:

The following villages are not listed in the 2011 census directory:Bohoram, Khonglo, Khunthak, Kongluiram, Nambashi Horton, Ngaranphung, Punomram, Reishangphung, Sangpunram, Somthar, and Tamaram.

References 

Kamjong